Utahloy International School Zengcheng (UISZ or UISZC) is an international school in Sanjiang Town, Zengcheng, Guangzhou, China. UISZ offers day school and boarding school programs for students in Kindergarten through Grade 12. The school currently serves approximately 200 students in grades K-12, with 120 in primary and 80 in secondary.

Boarding
Boarding students reside in the Dragon House. There are four floors, each with 36 rooms and four students per room.

References

External links
 Utahloy International School Zengcheng

International schools in Guangzhou
Boarding schools in China